Henry Cotton (1789 –1879) was an Anglo-Irish churchman, ecclesiastical historian and author.

Life
He was a native of Buckinghamshire. Beginning in 1803, he spent four years at Westminster School and then in 1807 he entered Christ Church, Oxford.  He obtained a B.A. in classics in 1811 and a M.A. in 1813. He would later dedicate his work on Bible editions to the memory of Cyril Jackson, dean of Christ Church.

He was sub-librarian of the Bodleian Library from 1814 to 1822.  In 1820 he received a D.C.L. from Oxford.

His father-in-law Richard Laurence was appointed Archbishop of Cashel, Ireland in 1822, so in 1823 Henry Cotton moved there to serve as his domestic chaplain. Cotton became the librarian at the Bolton Library. The following year Henry became archdeacon of Cashel.  In 1832 he became treasurer of Christ Church Cathedral, Dublin; in 1834 he became dean of Lismore Cathedral.

His eyesight began failing, causing him to retire from active duties of the ministry, and he gave up the deanery of Lismore in 1849. In 1872 he became almost totally blind. He died at his residence in Lismore 3 December 1879, and was buried in the graveyard of Lismore Cathedral.

Works
He wrote extensively, and among his works is the six-volume Fasti Ecclesiæ Hibernicæ, a compilation of brief biographical sketches giving "the succession of the prelates and members of the cathedral bodies in Ireland".

He also compiled A List of Editions of the Bible in English from 1505 to 1820, with Specimens of Translations, &c. (Oxford, 1821, second edition, corrected and enlarged, 1852).

Cotton's other works (not including occasional sermons and articles in periodicals) are:
 Dr. Wotton's Thoughts on a proper Method of studying Divinity, with Notes, &c. (Oxford, 1818).
 A Typographical Gazetteer attempted (Oxford, 1824, second edition, corrected and enlarged, 1831; and a second series, especially rich in details of the foundation of newspapers in the United States, and of missionary publications in our colonies, Oxford, 1866).
 Memoir of a French New Testament, with Bishop Kidder's Reflections on the same (London, 1827, second edition 1863).
 A Short Explanation of Obsolete Words in our Version of the Bible (Oxford, 1832).
 Five Books of Maccabees in English, with Notes and Illustrations (Oxford, 1832).
 Cui Bono? A Letter to the Right Hon. E. G. Stanley (Dublin, 1833).
 Fiat Justitia, a Letter to Sir H. Hardinge on the Present State of the Church in Ireland (Dublin, 1835).
 Rhemes and Doway: an Attempt to show what has been done by Roman Catholics for the diffusion of the Holy Scriptures in English (Oxford, 1855).
 The Four Gospels and the Acts of the Apostles, with short Notes for the use of schools and young persons (Oxford, 1857).

On the death of Archbishop Laurence in 1838 Cotton superintended the publication of Laurence's reproduction of the first ‘Visitation of the Saxon Reformed Church in 1527 and 1528,’ and he reissued the privately printed poetical pieces of Archbishop Laurence and his brother, French Laurence.

References

 
 

1789 births
1879 deaths
19th-century English Anglican priests
Church of Ireland priests
Historians of Christianity
British historians of religion
Irish historians of religion
Archdeacons of Cashel
Irish librarians